The Combat Logistics Battalion 25, (originally the 6th Motor Transport Battalion), is a Marine Forces Reserve logistics unit of the United States Marine Corps and is headquartered at Red Bank, New Jersey.  The unit falls under Combat Logistics Regiment 45 of the 4th Marine Logistics Group (4th MLG) and Marine Forces Reserve (MARFORRES).

Table of Organization - Combat Logistics Battalion 25
 Headquarters and Service Company
 Engineer Services Company
 Maintenance Services Company
 Transportation Services Company

See also

 List of United States Marine Corps battalions
 Organization of the United States Marine Corps

External links
 6th MTB’s official website

4th Marine Logistics Group
Logistics battalions of the United States Marine Corps
Red Bank